The 1973 Notre Dame Fighting Irish football team represented the University of Notre Dame during the 1973 NCAA Division I football season.  The Irish, coached by Ara Parseghian, ended the season undefeated with 11 wins and no losses, winning the national championship.  The Fighting Irish won the title by defeating the previously unbeaten and No. 1 ranked Alabama Crimson Tide in the 1973 Sugar Bowl by a score of a 24–23. The 1973 squad became the ninth Irish team to win the national title and the second under Parseghian. Although Notre Dame finished No. 1 in the AP Poll to claim the AP national title, they were not awarded the Coaches title, since Alabama was awarded the Coaches Poll title before the bowl season.

Season
Ara Parseghian's second national title team was led by its relentless rushing attack. Fullback Wayne Bullock (750 yards), halfback Art Best (700 yards), halfback Eric Penick (586 yards) and quarterback Tom Clements (360 yards) comprised one of the fastest Irish backfields, with Peneck and Best clocking in under 10 seconds in the 100-yard dash. The Irish started the season strong, amassing large margins of victory over Northwestern, Rice and Army to set up a highly anticipated contest with No. 6 and unbeaten USC. USC came into the contest riding a 23-game unbeaten streak, and USC's star tailback Anthony Davis ran over the Irish the previous year for 6 touchdowns in a 45–23 Trojan victory. Moreover, Parseghian had not outright beaten USC since 1966.  The Irish defense responded to the challenge, limiting Davis to 55 yards on 19 carries. The star tailback of the day was Notre Dame's Penick, who ran for 118 yards, 50 more than the entire Trojan team. The Irish won the contest 23–14 and won their remaining games. After Notre Dame accepted the Sugar Bowl bid, the stage was set to determine the national championship. Alabama was awarded the UPI title before the bowl season, but it was Notre Dame that won it on the field, winning 24–23 in a thriller that had six lead changes. Notre Dame jumped to a 6–0 lead, but Alabama answered with a Randy Billingsley 6-yard touchdown run. Al Hunter then scored on a 93-yard kickoff return, and Clements completed a two-point conversion pass to Pete Demmerle to give the Irish a 14-7 (which would turn out to be the widest margin in the game).  Alabama scored a field goal to close the halftime deficit to 14–10, and then went on a 93-yard touchdown march in the third quarter to regain the lead.  Notre Dame answered with a 12-yard touchdown run by Eric Penick to go back in front, 21–17. In the fourth quarter, three turnovers occurred in 90 seconds, with Alabama coming out on top and capitalizing on a halfback pass from Mike Stock to quarterback Richard Todd for a 25-yard touchdown to take a slim 23–21 lead, but the Tide missed the crucial extra point. Notre Dame responded, with Tom Clements driving the Irish 79 yards in 11 plays and setting up a potential field goal on a clutch 15-yard pass to tight end Dave Casper. Irish kicker Bob Thomas kicked a field goal to give the Irish a slim 24–23 victory and the AP national title.

Schedule

Roster

Game summaries

Northwestern

Purdue

Michigan State

Rice

Army

Southern Cal

Navy

Pittsburgh

Air Force
This is the only Thanksgiving Day game ever played at Notre Dame Stadium, and with students away on a week-long break, it also was the only official non-sellout for a Fighting Irish home football game between October 24, 1964, and November 16, 2019.

Miami (Florida)

Sugar Bowl vs. Alabama

Post-season

Award winners

All-Americans

College Football Hall of Fame inductees

Notre Dame leads all universities in players inducted.

1974 NFL Draft

References

Notre Dame
Notre Dame Fighting Irish football seasons
College football national champions
Sugar Bowl champion seasons
College football undefeated seasons
Notre Dame Fighting Irish football